Chang Kai-chen (born January 13, 1991), also known as Kelly Chang, is a Taiwanese former professional tennis player.

Career
Her father is Chang Chin-lai and mother is Jun Yu-mei; she has two older brothers, Yao-lun and Yao-chung (both play tennis). Born and raised in Taiwan, an hour from Taipei, Chang splits training between Taiwan and Delray Beach, Florida (International Tennis Academy). She started playing tennis at age six when introduced to sport by brothers at local tennis club. She is an aggressive baseliner whose favorite shot is backhand, her favorite surface is hardcourt.

She qualified for the 2009 US Open, where she beat 25th seed Kaia Kanepi 6–0, 2–6, 6–2 in her first-round match. At the 2009 Pan Pacific Open, Chang defeated world No. 1, Dinara Safina, 7–6, 4–6, 7–5 in her second-round match.

In July 2010, she reached her career-high singles ranking of world No. 82. In February 2013, she peaked at No. 65 in the WTA doubles rankings.

Playing for Chinese Taipei Fed Cup team, Chang has a win–loss record of 10–8.

Grand Slam performance timelines

Singles

Doubles

WTA career finals

Singles: 1 (runner–up)

Doubles: 4 (4 titles)

WTA 125 tournament finals

Singles: 3 (3 runner-ups)

Doubles: 4 (1 title, 3 runner-ups)

ITF Circuit finals

Singles: 11 (6 titles, 5 runner–ups)

Doubles: 24 (16 titles, 8 runner–ups)

Wins over top 10 players

References

External links

 
 
 

1991 births
Living people
People from Taoyuan District
Taiwanese female tennis players
Tennis players at the 2010 Asian Games
Asian Games medalists in tennis
Asian Games silver medalists for Chinese Taipei
Medalists at the 2010 Asian Games
Universiade medalists in tennis
Tennis players at the 2018 Asian Games
Universiade gold medalists for Chinese Taipei
Universiade bronze medalists for Chinese Taipei
Medalists at the 2017 Summer Universiade
Medalists at the 2015 Summer Universiade
Sportspeople from Taoyuan City
21st-century Taiwanese women